Alejandro Castro Fernández (born 27 February 1979), known as Jandro, is a Spanish former professional footballer who played as an attacking midfielder, and the current manager of Villarreal C.

He appeared in 331 Segunda División matches over 11 seasons, scoring a total of 73 goals for Celta, Albacete, Alavés, Gimnàstic, Elche and Girona. In La Liga, other than the first and the third clubs, he also played with Valencia.

Playing career
Jandro was born in Mieres, Asturias. A product of Valencia CF's youth system, he played three times for the first team in a three-year span (with a stint at CD Numancia in between, where he did not appear). Subsequently, he had another La Liga spell with RC Celta de Vigo, featuring sparingly over two seasons and also serving a loan.

After helping Celta regain their top-flight status in 2005, scoring 12 league goals, Jandro moved to Deportivo Alavés also of the top division, being immediately relegated. He signed with Gimnàstic de Tarragona in summer 2007 and, after two Segunda División seasons with the Catalans as first choice, continued in that tier as he joined Elche CF on a two-year contract.

On 11 March 2010, after appearing rarely for the club – but netting three times – Jandro was released by mutual consent. In late July he signed with another side in division two, Girona FC, and scored 11 goals while playing all 42 games (38 starts, nearly 3,500 minutes of action) in his first season, with his team eventually ranking 11th.

On 25 August 2012, Jandro was named Player of the match as Girona won 5–1 away against CD Guadalajara, scoring once and providing two assists.

Coaching career
On 6 July 2021, Jandro was named manager of Tercera División RFEF side CD Acero. The following 18 May, after narrowly missing out on promotion in the play-offs, he left.

Managerial statistics

References

External links

1979 births
Living people
Spanish footballers
Footballers from Mieres, Asturias
Association football midfielders
La Liga players
Segunda División players
Segunda División B players
Tercera División players
Valencia CF Mestalla footballers
Valencia CF players
CD Numancia players
RC Celta de Vigo players
Albacete Balompié players
Deportivo Alavés players
Gimnàstic de Tarragona footballers
Elche CF players
Girona FC players
Huracán Valencia CF players
Cádiz CF players
CD Olímpic de Xàtiva footballers
CF La Nucía players
Spain youth international footballers
Spanish football managers
Tercera Federación managers